Nguyễn Văn Nhieu (born 1930) is a Vietnamese former cyclist. He competed in the time trial event at the 1956 Summer Olympics.

References

External links
 

1930 births
Possibly living people
Vietnamese male cyclists
Olympic cyclists of Vietnam
Cyclists at the 1956 Summer Olympics
Place of birth missing (living people)